Kongunadu Makkal Katchi is a political party in Tamil Nadu, India, based amongst the Vellala Gounder caste. The party was founded shortly ahead of the 2001 Tamil Nadu Legislative Assembly election.

The party is led by A.M. Raja. The party acts as the political wing of the Kongu Vellala Gounder Forum.

In the 2001 Tamil Nadu assembly elections, KMK stood as an ally of the Dravida Munnetra Kazhagam. KMK contested one seat, Perundurai. Its candidate, N. Govindaswamy, got 40421 votes (32.43%).

See also
 Kongu Nadu Statehood movement

References

Political parties in Tamil Nadu
2000 establishments in Tamil Nadu
Political parties established in 2000